USS Grosbeak (SP-566) was a Grosbeak-class patrol boat acquired by the U.S. Navy for the task of patrolling and defending America's harbors and coasts.

Grosbeak, built by Rice Brothers, Boothbay, Maine, was acquired from her owner It. C. Robbins, Hamilton, Massachusetts, 17 April 1917.

World War I service 

She served as a coastal patrol craft along the New England coast from Chatham, Massachusetts, to New London, Connecticut, during World War I.

Deactivation 

Her name was struck from the Navy List in 1919 and she was sold to Clarence Kugler, Philadelphia, Pennsylvania, 21 March 1920.

References

External links 
 NavSource Online: Section Patrol Craft Photo Archive - Grosbeak (SP 566)

Ships built in Boothbay, Maine
Patrol vessels of the United States Navy
World War I patrol vessels of the United States